Marvin Zwickl (born 22 February 2004) is an Austrian footballer who plays as a right-back for Rapid Wien II.

Career statistics

Club

Notes

References

2004 births
Living people
Austrian footballers
Austria youth international footballers
Association football defenders
2. Liga (Austria) players
Wiener Sport-Club players
SK Rapid Wien players